The South China Karst, a UNESCO World Heritage Site since June 2007, spans the provinces of Chongqing, Guangxi, Guizhou, and Yunnan.  It is noted for its karst features and landscapes as well as rich biodiversity.  The site comprises seven clusters Phase I: Libo Karst, Shilin Karst, and Wulong Karst inscribed in 2007, and Phase II: Guilin Karst, Shibing Karst, Jinfoshan Karst, and Huanjiang Karst inscribed in 2014. UNESCO describes the South China Karst as "unrivalled in terms of the diversity of its karst features and landscapes."

South China Karst - UNESCO inscription details

Gallery

References

External links
 UNESCO World Heritage description

Karst formations of China
Landforms of Chongqing
Landforms of Guangxi
Landforms of Guizhou
Geography of Kunming
Rock formations of China
Tourist attractions in Chongqing
Tourist attractions in Guangxi
Tourist attractions in Guizhou
Tourist attractions in Yunnan
World Heritage Sites in China
Karst formations of Yunnan